Porchia is a surname. Notable people with the surname include:

Antonio Porchia (1885–1968), Argentine poet
Sandro Porchia (born 1977), Italian footballer